Maria is the fifth album by fado singer Carminho. It was released in 2018 by Warner Music Portugal. A review in PopMatters noted: "Taking a far more intimate approach to the record–writing most of the songs and lyrics and producing the album herself–she succeeds by making Maria a testament to the power of fado as well as a stunning examination of her musical prowess." The album peaked at No. 4 on the Associação Fonográfica Portuguesa chart and was certified as a gold album.

Track listing
 A Tecedeira (Carminho) [2:31]	
 O Começo [Fado Bizarro] (Acácio Gomes) [2:48]	
 Desengano [Fado Latino] (Jaime Santos) [1:49]
 O Menino e a Cidade (Joana Espadinha) [3:48]
 Estrela (Carminho) [4:39]
 Pop Fado (Fernando de Carvalho) [2:34]
 A Mulher Vento (Carminho) [3:27]
 Poeta (Carminho) [2:48]
 Se Vieres [Fado Sta. Luzia] (Armando Machado) [3:27]
 Quero um Cavalo de Várias Cores (Carminho) [3:29]
 Sete Saias (Artur Ribeiro) [3:06]
 As Rosas (Joana Espadinha) [3:39]

References

Carminho albums
2018 albums
Portuguese-language albums
Warner Music Group albums